Qashqadaryo may refer to:
 Qashqadaryo (river), a river in Uzbekistan
 Qashqadaryo Region, an administrative region of Uzbekistan